Chromosome 19 open reading frame 70, also known as QIL1, MICOS complex subunit MIC13 (MIC13) or Protein P117 is a protein that in humans is encoded by the C19orf70 gene.

Structure
The C19orf70 gene is located on the p arm of chromosome 19 at position 13.3 and it spans 2,482 base pairs. The C19orf70 gene produces a 9.7 kDa protein composed of 88 amino acids.

Function
The C19orf70 gene encodes for a subunit of the MICOS (mitochondrial contact site and cristae junction organizing system) complex of the mitochondrial inner membrane. The 700-kD complex plays diverse roles such as the maintenance of crista junctions, formation of contact junctions to the outer membrane, and the dynamic regulation of mitochondrial membrane architecture. C19orf70, a component of the mature MICOS complex, localizes to the inner mitochondrial membrane at the cristae junctions and incorporates MINOS1 and MIC10 into the MICOS complex. The protein is necessary for the creation of the cristae junction, integrity of the cristae junction, and maintenance of cristae morphology. It is also essential for normal mitochondrial function.

Clinical Significance
Mutations in C19orf70 has been shown to result in mitochondrial deficiencies and related disorders caused by the disassembly of MICOS complex with abnormal cristae morphology and failure of mitochondrial respiration. Major clinical manifestations have included mitochondrial hepato-encephalopathy and 3-methylglutaconic aciduria accompanied by severe psychomotor retardation, intractable seizures, cerebellar atrophy, early death, Lactic acidemia, neutropenia, and elevated liver transaminases.

Interactions
C19orf70 has been known to interact with MRPL24, APOOL, STOML2, IMMT, MTX1, CHCHD3, and other proteins.

References

Further reading